Reeve Township is one of sixteen townships in Franklin County, Iowa, United States.  As of the 2010 census, its population was 262 and it contained 135 housing units.

History
Reeve Township was organized in 1855. It was named for J. B. Reeve, a pioneer settler.

Geography

Unincorporated towns
 Reeve at 
(This list is based on USGS data and may include former settlements.)

Cemeteries
The township contains Maynes Grove Cemetery, Maysville Cemetery, Redding Cemetery and Towle Cemetery.

Transportation
 U.S. Route 65

School districts
 Agwsr Community School District
 Hampton-Dumont Community School District

Political districts
 Iowa's 4th congressional district
 State House District 54
 State Senate District 27

References

External links
 City-Data.com

Townships in Iowa
Townships in Franklin County, Iowa
Populated places established in 1855
1855 establishments in Iowa